Kadiria District is a district of Bouïra Province, Algeria.

Municipalities
The district is further divided into 3 municipalities:
Kadiria
Aomar 
Djebahia

Districts of Bouïra Province